Miracles of St Bernardino is a series of eight tempera-on-panel paintings showing miracles associated with Bernardino of Siena. They date to 1473 and are now in the Galleria Nazionale dell'Umbria.

Attributed to the Master of 1473 or the Studio of 1473 and influenced by Piero della Francesca, they involved several of the most notable Umbrian painters of the era such as Perugino, Pinturicchio and Piermatteo Lauro de' Manfredi da Amelia.

History
In 1473 the Franciscan friars of Perugia commissioned Perugino and other artists to paint eight panels to hang above a niche holding a statue of Bernardino in the town's oratorio di San Bernardino. Bernardino had only be canonised in 1450. At least five hands took part in the commission. One of the best paintings in the series is St Bernardino Curing a Young Girl, attributed to Perugino himself. The Miracle of the Stillborn Child is partly attributed to him. It is unknown when the series was taken down and later found rehung in the church of San Francesco al Prato in the town.

List of works

Saint Bernardino Curing a Young Girl (Perugino)
Saint Bernardino Giving Sight to a Blind Man After His Death (Perugino and Pinturicchio)
Saint Bernardino Appearing After His Death and Freeing a Prisoner (Pinturicchio)
Saint Bernardino Reviving a man found under a tree on the road to Verona (Pinturicchio)
Saint Bernardino curing Nicola di Lorenzo da Prato, attacked by a bull
The Miracle of the Stillborn Child (School of Perugino)
Saint Bernardino Appearing at Night to Giovan Antonio Tornaro and Healing His Wound from a Trap
Saint Bernardino appearing after his death and curing Giovanni Antonio da Parma, injured by a shovel

Bibliography (in Italian)
 Vittoria Garibaldi, Perugino, in Pittori del Rinascimento, Scala, Florence, 2004 
 Pierluigi De Vecchi, Elda Cerchiari, I tempi dell'arte, volume 2, Bompiani, Milan, 1999 
 Stefano Zuffi, Il Quattrocento, Electa, Milan, 2004 

Paintings by Pietro Perugino
Paintings by Pinturicchio
1470s paintings
Collections of the Galleria Nazionale dell'Umbria